Jonder Martínez Martínez (born June 22, 1978, in Mariel, Havana Province, Cuba) is a right-handed pitcher for Matanzas of the Cuban National Series and the Cuban national baseball team.

Martínez played for the national team at the 1995 World Junior Championship, 2003 Baseball World Cup, 2004 Summer Olympics, 2006 World Baseball Classic, 2006 Haarlem Baseball Week, 2007 Pan American Games, 2007 Baseball World Cup and 2008 Summer Olympics, 2014 Central American and Caribbean Games and 2017 World Baseball Classic.

References

External links

 

1978 births
Living people
Vaqueros de la Habana players
Olympic baseball players of Cuba
Baseball players at the 2004 Summer Olympics
Baseball players at the 2007 Pan American Games
Baseball players at the 2008 Summer Olympics
Baseball players at the 2011 Pan American Games
Olympic gold medalists for Cuba
Olympic silver medalists for Cuba
2006 World Baseball Classic players
2017 World Baseball Classic players
Olympic medalists in baseball
Medalists at the 2008 Summer Olympics
2015 WBSC Premier12 players
Medalists at the 2004 Summer Olympics
Pan American Games gold medalists for Cuba
Pan American Games bronze medalists for Cuba
Pan American Games medalists in baseball
Cazadores de Artemisa players
Naranjas de Villa Clara players
Cocodrilos de Matanzas players
Central American and Caribbean Games gold medalists for Cuba
Competitors at the 2014 Central American and Caribbean Games
Central American and Caribbean Games medalists in baseball
Medalists at the 2011 Pan American Games
People from Artemisa Province